Franco Lepore (born 16 August 1985) is an Italian professional footballer who plays as a right-back for  club Lecco.

Career 
Lepore joined Serie C side Monza in January 2019, helping them gain promotion to the Serie B for the first time in 19 years. On 1 February 2021, Lepore joined Triestina in the Serie C.

On 3 November 2021, he signed with Pergolettese.

On 5 August 2022, Lepore moved to Lecco.

Honours
Lecce
 Serie B: 2009–10

Monza
 Serie C Group A: 2019–20

References

External links
 
 

1985 births
Living people
Sportspeople from Lecce
Footballers from Apulia
Italian footballers
Association football fullbacks
A.S.G. Nocerina players
U.S. Lecce players
A.C. Monza players
U.S. Triestina Calcio 1918 players
U.S. Pergolettese 1932 players
Calcio Lecco 1912 players
Serie A players
Serie B players
Serie C players